Seoul Subway Line 6 is a line of the Seoul Metropolitan Subway. The route connects Eunpyeong-gu and Jungnang-gu in a U-shaped manner, running through Yongsan-gu and Seongbuk-gu. It does not cross the Han River. It is mainly used to connect to the northern outskirts of Seoul and to relieve the traffic on other lines.

The line primarily operates in the section between Eungam and Sinnae, though some trains end one station before at Bonghwasan. When a train arrives at Eungam, it runs through what is commonly known as the "Eungam Loop," a one-way counterclockwise loop consisting of several stations. After going through the stations of the Eungam Loop, the train reaches Eungam again, from which it continues to Bonghwasan or Sinnae.

History
The line started construction in 1994. A short section of the line from Bonghwasan to Sangwolgok opened in August 2000 while the remaining section opened in December of the same year. However, it was not until March 2001 that the whole line was fully operational when the four stations from Itaewon to Yaksu were opened.

Upon the opening of the electrified Gyeongchun Line in December 2010, Seoul Metro proposed extending the line 1 km eastward to connect to the Gyeongchun Line at a new Sinnae station, located in the current Sinnae Depot. Construction on the station started in late 2018 and the extension opened on December 21, 2019. In 2019, Line 6 had an annual ridership of 205 million or about 562 thousand people per day.

Tourism
In January 2013, the Seoul Metropolitan Rapid Transit Corporation, which operates this line, published free guidebooks in three languages: English, Japanese and Chinese (simplified and traditional), which features eight tours as well as recommendations for accommodations, restaurants and shopping centers. These were distributed from information centers on this line. The tours are designed with different themes for travel along the subway lines, e.g. Korean traditional culture, which goes from Jongno 3-ga Station to Anguk Station and Gyeongbokgung Station on line 3 that showcases antique shops and art galleries of Insa-dong.

Stations

Rolling stock

Current

Seoul Metro 
 Seoul Metro 6000 series
 1st generation – since 1999

References

See also 

 Subways in South Korea
 Seoul Metropolitan Rapid Transit Corporation
 Seoul Metropolitan Subway

 
Seoul Metropolitan Subway lines
Railway lines opened in 2000